China–Singapore relations, also known as Chinese–Singaporean relations or Sino–Singaporean relations, refers to the bilateral relations between the People's Republic of China and the Republic of Singapore. Relations between the two countries formally started on 3 October 1990. Diplomatic missions were established in the early 1990s based on trade and the warming of ties from other ASEAN countries towards mainland China.

Singapore and China have maintained a long-standing and close relationship, partly because of the latter's growing influence and essentiality in the Asia-Pacific region, specifying that "its common interest with China is far greater than any differences". Furthermore, Singapore has positioned itself as a strong supporter for China's engagement and development in the region. It has engaged co-operation with other ASEAN members and China to strengthen regional security and fight terrorism, while participating in the organisation's first maritime exercise with the latter.

While the relationship between the two countries remains strong, it has been strained during numerous recent high-profile events, including Singapore's stance against China regarding the South China Sea dispute, Singapore's support for the United States' military presence and alliance system in Asia, and the seizing of Singapore Armed Forces' vehicles by Hong Kong authorities in November 2016.

Despite the disputes, Singapore and Beijing have consistently affirmed their close relationship and bilateral ties, deepening their co-operation in numerous areas, including defense, economy, culture and education, as well as the One Belt One Road Initiative. Singapore has also vowed to fully support and promote China's position in ASEAN, while managing the differences between the Chinese state and the organisation.

History

Singapore as a British colony and as a part of Malaysia
Historic links between the two nations' people began much earlier than the founding of the People's Republic of China in October 1949. Most early Chinese migrants came as labourers to what was known as Nanyang to escape poverty and war. Many ethnic Chinese Singaporeans derived their ancestral roots in southern China from Fujian, Guangdong and Hainan.

Many ethnic Chinese people in Malaya and Singapore had supported China in the Second Sino-Japanese War (that became a part of the Second World War). This support extended to aiding the Kuomintang and the Chinese Communist Party against the Japanese. Much like the Viet Minh, the Malayan People's Anti-Japanese Army guerrilla force turned into the Malayan National Liberation Army, associated with the Malayan Communist Party. The Malayan National Liberation Army fought in the Malayan Emergency and the Second Malayan Emergency as communist guerrillas, and China was accused of exporting revolution to Southeast Asia during this time. China's support for the Malayan Communist Party ended when Malaysia and China established diplomatic relations in 1974.

The ethnic Chinese people were major supporters of the Malayan Communist Party, and Chinese-language secondary schools and Nanyang University were viewed hotbeds of communism (see Operation Cold Store and Chinese middle schools riots). Because of this association, Nanyang University was reorganised. It eventually merged with the University of Singapore to form the National University of Singapore.

Post-Singapore independence
Lee Kuan Yew, the first Prime Minister of Singapore was very careful to avoid giving any impression to the other countries in Southeast Asia that Singapore, three-quarters ethnic Chinese, was a "Third China" (the first two being the Republic of China and the People's Republic of China). This was due to Singapore's experience with communists, the backdrop of the ongoing Vietnam War, as well as domestic political considerations. As a result, Singapore did not establish diplomatic relations with China until the other countries in Southeast Asia had decided they wanted to do so, to avoid portraying a pro-China bias. His official visits to China starting in 1976 were conducted in English, to assure other Southeast Asian countries that he represented Singapore, and not a "Third China".

During this period, Lee believed in the need to resist communism as part of the domino theory. Between the failure of the British to defend Singapore in the Second World War and the belief that the United States was too war-weary to defend Singapore from communism, Lee welcomed American presence in the region to act as a counterweight to the Soviet Union and China.

In the 1970s, People's Republic of China and Singapore began unofficial relations. This led to the exchange of Trade Offices between the two nations in September 1981. In 1985, commercial air services between mainland China and Singapore commenced.

Diplomatic ties between the two countries officially began in 1990. On 3 October 1990, Singapore revised diplomatic relations from the Republic of China to the People's Republic of China. The relationship between Singapore and the PRC has since improved significantly. In 2004, shortly before the current Prime Minister of Singapore Lee Hsien Loong took office from the then incumbent Goh Chok Tong, he made a visit to Taiwan to familiarise himself with the latest developments there. Bilateral ties took a dive. The People's Republic of China took offence to the trip due to the complicated political status of the region Later in 2004, Chinese government put bilateral relations on hold. In his maiden National Day Rally speech, Lee criticised the Taiwanese leadership and populace of overestimating the support they would receive if they were to declare Taiwan independence;

Singapore was the last country in Southeast Asia to formally recognize the People's Republic of China. Singapore still maintains unofficial relations with the Republic of China, including the continuation of a controversial military training and facilities agreement from 1975. This is due to a lack of usable space in built-up Singapore. The People's Republic of China has officially offered Singapore to shift its training facilities from Taiwan to Hainan Island, with official annual military exercises known as Exercise Starlight (星光計畫) in Taiwan.

Relations between the two countries gradually improved as China and Singapore forged agreements in free trade, education, foreign investment, modern armament and technology. Examples include the Suzhou Industrial Park and the Sino-Singapore Tianjin Eco-city, which were constructed with the help of Singapore.

Diplomatic incidents

South China Sea dispute 
While Singapore is not a party to the territorial disputes in the South China Sea, it has an interest in the outcome of these disputes since they have implications for international law, freedom of navigation, and ASEAN unity. In 2016, China's Global Times accused Singapore of supporting the Philippines v. China ruling in favour of the Philippines during the Non-Aligned Movement meeting in Venezuela, based on unnamed sources. The Global Times''' account was disputed by Singapore's ambassador to China, Stanley Loh. Thereafter, Yin Jinnan of the PLA National Defence University commented that "Beijing should make Singapore pay the price for seriously damaging China's interests" with retaliations and sanctions".

 2016 Terrex seizure incident 
In November 2016, nine Singapore Army Terrex ICV armoured personnel carriers and associated equipment were seized by the Hong Kong Customs and Excise Department at the Kwai Tsing Container Terminal (formerly Kwai Chung Container Terminal). The vehicles and equipment were being shipped back to Singapore from Taiwan after a military exercise in Taiwan. The shipment was seized because American President Lines (APL), the private shipping company engaged by the Singapore military to handle the shipment, did not have the appropriate permits for the vehicles equipment. The shipment was later moved to the Hong Kong Customs depot at Hong Kong River Trade Terminal and kept indoors since 6 December 2016. This was Hong Kong's biggest seizure of such equipment in the past twenty years. In January 2017, 2 months after the Terrex APC vehicles were detained, Hong Kong Customs announced that the military vehicles would be returned to Singapore. Commissioner of the Customs and Excise Department, Roy Tang Yun-kwong, said that shipping company American President Lines would likely face criminal charges over the incident for suspected breach of the Hong Kong Law.

Some observers believe that Chinese attitudes toward Singapore are changing, in that they now know not to assume Singapore's support on international issues on the basis of ethnicity.

Diplomatic representation
China has its embassy on Tanglin Road in Singapore, while Singapore's embassy in Beijing on Jianguomen Wai Avenue, Chaoyang District was established in 1990, and it has Consulates-General in Chengdu, Guangzhou, Shanghai, and Xiamen, as well as Hong Kong, known during the era of British rule as the Singapore Commission.

Trade
The bilateral trade between China and Singapore developed rapidly in recent years and Singapore has maintained the first position among ASEAN countries in their trade with China. China's transformation into a major economic power in the 21st century has led to an increase of foreign investments in the bamboo network, a network of overseas Chinese businesses operating in the markets of Southeast Asia that share common family and cultural ties.

In 1998, volume of trade was US$8.154 billion In 1999, the trade value has increased to US$8.56 billion. In 2000, the amount increased to US$10.821 billion. In 2009, the total trade volume was SGD 75.1 billion (US$58.4 billion).

Singapore is China's 9th largest trading partner, while China is Singapore's 3rd largest trading partner which consisted of 10.1 percent of Singapore's total external trade from the previous year.

China's exports to Singapore were textiles, clothing, agriculture produce, petrochemical, metals, electromechanical equipment, feed, coking coal, shipping, machinery supplier, communication equipment and electronic components.

Companies such as Capitaland and Breadtalk have made substantial inroads into China's domestic economy. Others such as Temasek Holdings, Singapore Airlines have each invested in China Eastern Airlines.

Culture and education
One of the most visible symbols of China's efforts to export its soft power is the Confucius Institute. Confucius Institute in Singapore was established in 2005 as a collaboration with Nanyang Technological University, successor to the former Chinese-language Nanyang University. Its stated mission is to provide Singapore with a platform for learning the Chinese language and its culture, and enhancing communication with other Chinese communities. In November 2015, China opened the China Cultural Centre in Singapore, to facilitate exchanges in arts and culture. Current difficulties notwithstanding, Singapore's economically successful dominant party system has led its political system to be studied and cited as a potential model for China's government. Such a viewpoint has been institutionalised: Nanyang Technological University offers master's degree programs that are well-attended by Chinese public officials.

Outside of programs for public officials, Singapore is a popular destination for Chinese students due to its education standards, its proximity to home, its perceived cultural similarities, and the cost of an education as opposed to the US or UK. Paradoxically, while some Chinese students like Singapore for its cultural similarity, its meritocratic culture in contrast with the Mainland Chinese concept of guanxi (connections) is also viewed in a positive light. A study in 2016 of Singaporean locals and (mostly mainland) Chinese students found that most respondents in both groups said they had pleasant interactions with each other (despite most Singaporeans saying the students tended to hang out in their own clique).

Aside from bilateral exchanges, Singapore's Chinese-language Lianhe Zaobao newspaper has been cited by Chinese officials as a symbol of Singapore's soft power through its reporting on China to the world. Zaobao.com was the first Chinese-language newspaper website to be available in 1995. In 2009, access to Lianhe Zaobao was reportedly blocked by China's Great Firewall for a period, presumably due to Lianhe Zaobao'''s reporting on China's internet censorship.

Chinese immigration to Singapore

Chinese people have immigrated to what is known as Singapore since Zheng He's voyages in the 15th century; those early immigrants integrated into the host societies, and their descendants are now known as Peranakans. Modern Chinese immigration is defined here as that occurring after Singapore's independence in 1965. Chinese immigrants to Singapore range from university students, skilled and unskilled labourers, professionals, and investors.

The majority of Singaporeans are ethnic Chinese (74.3% in 2015), causing some people in China to view Singapore as a Chinese society that should consequently be sympathetic to China's interests. Addressing and coordinating mutual interests and expectations has always been central to the China–Singapore relations from their first government-to-government contacts. In fact, in one these early meetings, Chinese officials spoke of their affinity toward visiting Singaporean officials, referring to the latter as "kinsmen", to which Prime Minister of Singapore Lee Kuan Yew remarked, while acknowledging "a very special relationship", "We are different like the New Zealanders and the Australians are different from the British. Well, I think I am very intrigued by that word 'kinsmen' because it implies a special empathy, and I have no ideological empathy. Therefore, I hope the empathy will be in some other field like economic development or comparing notes on how we could help each other's economies." More recently, some people from China have taken to describing Singapore as "Po County" (坡县), comparing it with a county of China. This reference is made by some Chinese people due to cultural similarities and is intended as an endearing nickname.

The Singaporean Chinese today are largely Singapore-born and bred with the exception of some first-generation Chinese, and have no loyalty to either the People's Republic of China or to the Republic of China (Taiwan). Singapore is especially sensitive to racial strife due to past riots (see list of riots in Singapore), so Singapore's nation-building efforts have focused on building a multicultural Singaporean identity on top of Singaporeans' racial identities.

The differing Singaporean and Chinese expectations lead to misunderstandings when China and Singapore's foreign policies are in conflict, as described above. These misunderstandings also occur when Chinese citizens migrate to Singapore and conflict with the existing multicultural Singapore-centric society. Examples of this conflict include a curry dispute that pointed to an immigrant family's difficulty with accepting the local culture, an illegal bus driver strike in 2013 that challenged Singapore's sense of law and order, and a traffic collision by a Chinese immigrant driving at 178 km/h killing several people that angered Singaporeans. Some Singaporeans view these instances as manifestations of Chinese immigrants' lack of respect of the local culture, and an unwillingness to integrate. Similar backlash has been reported towards Indian, Filipino, and Bangladeshi immigrants. Such views have been exacerbated by immigrants in general competing for opportunities and resources.

A study in 2016 of 10 PRC wives and 20 PRC students in Singapore found that 100% of the former and 90% of the latter said being polite to strangers was important. Of the 20 Chinese Singaporeans surveyed, 45% agreed with the view that mainland migrants were rude (although only 15% expressed negative attitudes towards mainland Chinese in general).

In sports, the Singaporean identity has been big enough to the point that Olympic medals won by China-born Singaporean athletes in 2008 and 2012 who had freshly received citizenship from the city-state (such as Feng Tianwei, Wang Yuegu, and Li Jiawei) were not considered Singaporean victories by many locals.

Public opinion 
Singaporean journalist Maria Siow wrote in July 2020 that in line with China's media narratives, the mainland Chinese she met tended to see Singapore as a one-party state that tolerates no dissent, but also as efficient and corruption-free, and responsible for teaching China a lot during its reform process, with Lee Kuan Yew also viewed as an amazing leader.

According to a November 2020 survey conducted by scholars from the Lee Kuan Yew School of Public Policy and the University of British Columbia, 69% of Chinese respondents held a favourable view of Singapore. A March 2022 survey funded by the European Regional Development Fund and run by the Central European Institute of Asian Studies also had most mainland Chinese respondents viewing Singapore positively and viewing Singaporeans as friendly to Chinese travellers. According to a 2022 survey conducted by Renmin University of China and the Global Times Research Center on Chinese views of ASEAN, Singapore was rated the most appealing ASEAN member by local respondents.

A 2022 poll conducted by Pew Research Center had 67% of Singaporean respondents expressing a positive view of China. Another survey conducted in 2022 by the Central European Institute of Asian Studies also had most Singaporean respondents viewing China positively.

See also 
ASEAN–China Free Trade Area
Bamboo network
Gwadar Port controversy

References

Further reading

External links 
Chinese Embassy in Singapore  
Singapore Embassy in Beijing

 
Singapore
Bilateral relations of Singapore